Carabus galicianus is a species of beetle from family Carabidae found in Spain and Portugal.

References

galicianus
Beetles described in 1839
Beetles of Europe